Ottó Szabó (born 16 December 1955) is a former Hungarian professional footballer who played as a forward, later became a football coach. He was a member of the Hungarian national football team.

Career 
He played for Győri Dózsa until 1974. Between 1974 and 1990 he scored 69 goals in 350 league matches for Győri ETO FC. He was a member of the team that won two championships, two silver and one bronze medal between 1982 and 1986. In the early 1990s he retired from active football with SVg Wiener Neudorf in Austria.

National team 
In 1984 he made one appearance for the national team.

Honours 

 Nemzeti Bajnokság I (NB I)
 Champion: 1981-82, 1982-83
 Second: 1983-84, 1984-85

 Magyar Kupa (MNK)
 Winner: 1979
 Finalist: 1985

References 

1955 births
Living people
Hungary international footballers
Nemzeti Bajnokság I players
Győri ETO FC managers
Győri ETO FC players
Association football forwards
Hungarian football managers
Hungarian footballers
Hungarian expatriate footballers
Expatriate footballers in Austria
Hungarian expatriate sportspeople in Austria
Sportspeople from Győr